Panphanpong Pinkong (born March 27, 1987), or simply known as Kew, is a Thai professional footballer who plays as a left-back.

Honours
Port
 Thai FA Cup (1) : 2019

External links
Panphanpong Pinkong profile at Port website

1987 births
Living people
Panphanpong Pinkong
Panphanpong Pinkong
Association football defenders
Panphanpong Pinkong
Panphanpong Pinkong
Panphanpong Pinkong
Panphanpong Pinkong
Panphanpong Pinkong